Adado is a city in the Galguduud region of Galmudug state in central Somalia.

Transportation
Air transportation in the city is served by Adado International Airport as the largest airport in Galmudug. A major renovation took place in the airport in 2022, a new airport immigration was built in 2013 funded by the former regional state of Himan and Heeb.

Notes

References
Adado, Somalia

Populated places in Galguduud
Galmudug